Littoraria articulata is a species of sea snail, a marine gastropod mollusc in the family Littorinidae, the winkles or periwinkles.

Distribution
Vietnam.

Description

Ecology
Littoraria articulata is a predominantly mangrove-associated species.

References

Littorinidae
Gastropods described in 1846